Spilarctia pratti is a moth in the family Erebidae. It was described by George Thomas Bethune-Baker in 1904. It is found in New Guinea.

Subspecies
Spilarctia pratti pratti
Spilarctia pratti eichhorni (Rothschild, 1917)

References

Natural History Museum Lepidoptera generic names catalog

Moths described in 1904
pratti